’Twixt Twelve and Twenty is a book by Pat Boone which offered advice to teenagers.

Royalties went to the Northeastern Institution for a Christian education.

The book was a best seller.

References

Pat Boone
1958 non-fiction books
Works about adolescence
Prentice Hall books